Diocese of Norwich Education and Academies Trust is a multi-academy trust, serving schools in the Diocese of Norwich, in Norfolk and the Waveney Valley. These are predominantly former Church of England village primary schools.

Primary academies

Brisley Church of England Primary Academy
Castle Acre Church of England Primary Academy
Cawston Church of England Primary Academy
Colkirk Church of England Primary Academy
Dereham Church of England Junior Academy
Ditchingham Church of England Primary Academy
Flitcham Church of England Primary Academy
Gayton Church of England Primary Academy
Gillingham St Michael's Church of England Primary Academy
Gooderstone Church of England Primary Academy
Great Witchingham Church of England Primary Academy
Hockering Church of England Primary Academy
Hopton Church of England Primary Academy
Kessingland Church of England Primary Academy
Little Snoring Community Primary Academy
Middleton Church of England Primary Academy
Moorlands Church of England Primary Academy
Mundford Church of England Primary Academy
Narborough Church of England Primary Academy
Peterhouse Church of England Primary Academy
Rudham Church of England Primary Academy
Sandringham and West Newton Church of England Primary Academy
Sculthorpe Church of England Primary Academy
Sporle Church of England Primary Academy
St Michael's Church of England Academy
St Peter & St Paul Church of England Primary Academy
St Peter's Church of England Primary Academy
Swaffham Church of England Junior Academy
The Bishop's Church of England Primary Academy
Thomas Bullock Church of England Primary Academy
Weasenham Church of England Primary Academy
West Raynham Church of England Primary Academy
Whitefriars Church of England Primary Academy

Secondary academies
Open Academy, Norwich

References

Multi-academy trusts